Naftidrofuryl (INN), also known as nafronyl or as the oxalate salt naftidrofuryl oxalate or nafronyl oxalate, is a vasodilator used in the management of peripheral and cerebral vascular disorders. It is also claimed to enhance cellular oxidative capacity. The drug act as a selective antagonist of 5-HT2 receptors (with action as an inverse agonist of the 5-HT2A receptor specifically characterized). Naftidrofuryl is also licensed for the treatment of intermittent claudication due to peripheral arterial disease.

Naftidrofuryl is marketed under a variety of trade names, including Artocoron, Azunaftil, Di-Actane, Dusodril, Enelbin, Frilix, Gevatran, Iridus, Iridux, Luctor, Nafti, Naftilong, Naftodril, Nafoxal, Praxilene, Sodipryl retard, and Vascuprax.

Historically, it has been used to treat sudden idiopathic hearing loss and acute tinnitus.

Naftidrofuryl may be effective for relieving the pain of muscle cramps.

Adverse Effects
Naftidrofuryl has been associated with nausea, abdominal pain and rash. Rarely, hepatitis and liver failure have been reported.

See also 
 Ketanserin
 Sarpogrelate

References 

5-HT2 antagonists
5-HT2A antagonists
Vasodilators
Merck brands
1-Naphthyl compounds
Tetrahydrofurans
Carboxylate esters
Diethylamino compounds